Ya'akov Yosef (18 October 1946 – 12 April 2013) was an Israeli rabbi and politician who served as a member of the Knesset for Shas between 1984 and 1988.

Early life
Ya'akov Yosef (Jacob Joseph) was born in Jerusalem towards the end of the Mandate era, the second child (oldest son) of Ovadia Yosef, a prominent rabbi. He was educated in the Porat Yosef and Kol Torah yeshivas in Bayit VeGan. He was later certified as a rabbi at the Rav Kook Institute.

Career
In the early 1980s, Yosef became a member of the new Shas party founded by his father, and represented it on Jerusalem city council between 1983 and 1984. In 1984, he was elected to the Knesset on the Shas list, and sat on the Constitution, Law and Justice Committee, the Education and Culture Committee and the Parliamentary Inquiry Committee for Traffic Accidents, until losing his seat in the 1988 elections. He later drifted away from his father's positions. In 2004, his father overruled one of Yosef's Halakhic rulings, which forbade soldiers from eating food provided by the army, condemning it as "inciteful."

He was the head of the Hazon Ya'akov yeshiva (which is named after his grandfather), and the rabbi for the Givat Moshe neighbourhood in Jerusalem. His brother, Avraham, was the chief rabbi of Holon.

His son, Yonatan Yosef, a prominent Jerusalem rabbi, is the spokesman for Jewish Settlers in Sheikh Jarrah, and a prominent activists for the Judaization of East Jerusalem. In 2013, Yonatan ran for Jerusalem City Council.

Controversy
On 3 July 2011, Yosef was arrested on suspicion of incitement to racism for his endorsement of the book The King's Torah, after he failed to report to the police for questioning, and released shortly thereafter. The arrest and questioning sparked protests among his supporters.

In November 2012, during Operation Pillar of Defense, Yosef said in a sermon in Hebron, West Bank: "The IDF [Israeli Defence Forces] must learn from the Syrians how to slaughter and crush the enemy."

Illness and death
On 12 April 2013, at the age of 66, Yosef died in Jerusalem's Hadassah Ein Kerem hospital around a year after being diagnosed with cancer. He was buried in the Har Hamenuchot cemetery.

References

External links

1946 births
2013 deaths
City councillors of Jerusalem
Deaths from cancer in Israel
Deaths from pancreatic cancer
Israeli Haredim
Jewish Israeli politicians
Orthodox Jews in Mandatory Palestine
Members of the 11th Knesset (1984–1988)
Ovadia Yosef
Politicians from Jerusalem
Rabbinic members of the Knesset
Sephardic Haredi rabbis in Israel
Shas politicians
Sephardi rabbis in Mandatory Palestine